Filip Sunturlić (born April 14, 1982) is a Serbian marketing specialist, basketball executive and former professional basketball player. Most recently, he served as the general manager of KK Crvena zvezda of the Basketball League of Serbia and the Adriatic League.

Playing career 
Sunturlić spent the 2006–07 season with Spartak Subotica of the Basketball League of Serbia.

In Bosnia and Herzegovina, Sunturlić played for Leotar, Hercegovac, KK Student Tuzla and HKK Vitez. In Cyprus, he played for Petrolina AEK Larnaca during the 2008–09 season. Also, he played professional basketball for Rabotnički (Macedonia) and Petrochimi Bandar Imam (Iran).

Basketball executive career

Crvena zvezda (2011–2021) 
Sunturlić have been serving as a marketing director for KK Crvena zvezda since September 2011. In July 2017, his marketing team was awarded with the Bronze Devotion Marketing Award from Euroleague Basketball. In March 2018, EuroLeague Basketball named him as a member of a working group for marketing and business development.

In July 2018, he was named as a general manager for Crvena zvezda, succeeding Davor Ristović on that position. As the general manager of the Zvezda, Sunturlić won two Serbian League championships (2018–19, 2020–21), a National Cup tournament (2021), and two Adriatic League championships (2019, 2021). He ended his term on 31 December 2021.

Personal life 
Sunturlić earned his master's degree in sports marketing and management from the Ca' Foscari University of Venice in 2014. 

In March 2008, he became an executive director for FTS Sport Media.

References

External links
 Player Profile at the eurobasket.com

1982 births
Living people
AEK Larnaca B.C. players
Basketball players from Belgrade
Basketball League of Serbia players
Ca' Foscari University of Venice alumni
Guards (basketball)
Serbian marketing people
KK Crvena Zvezda executives
KK Leotar players
KK Rabotnički players
KK Spartak Subotica players
Petrochimi Bandar Imam BC players
Serbian basketball executives and administrators
Serbian expatriate basketball people in Bosnia and Herzegovina
Serbian expatriate basketball people in Cyprus
Serbian expatriate basketball people in Iran
Serbian expatriate basketball people in North Macedonia
Serbian men's basketball players